David McKenna may refer to:
David McKenna (footballer) (born 1986), Scottish footballer
David McKenna (writer) (born 1968), American screenwriter and producer
David McKenna (politician) (?–2014), Canadian optometrist, businessman and politician
Dave McKenna (1930–2008), jazz pianist
 Dave McKenna (stunt rider) (born 1987), Australian street bike stunt performer